From the Earth to the Moon is a 1958 American Technicolor science fiction film, produced by Benedict Bogeaus, directed by Byron Haskin, that stars Joseph Cotten, George Sanders, and Debra Paget. Production of the  film originated at RKO Pictures, but when RKO went into bankruptcy, the film was acquired and released by Warner Brothers.

From the Earth to the Moon is a film adaptation of Jules Verne's 1865 science fiction novel of the same name.

Plot
Shortly after the end of the American Civil War, munitions producer Victor Barbicane announces that he has invented a new explosive, "Power X", which he claims is much more powerful than any previously devised. Metallurgist Stuyvesant Nicholl scoffs at Barbicane's claims and offers a wager of $100,000 ($ million today) that it cannot destroy his invention, the hardest metal in existence. Barbicane stages a demonstration using a puny cannon and demolishes Nicholl's material (and a portion of the countryside).

President Ulysses S. Grant requests that Barbicane cease development of his invention after several nervous countries warn that continuing work on Power X could be considered an act of war. Barbicane agrees, but when he discovers that pieces of Nicholl's metal retrieved from the demonstration have somehow been converted into an extremely strong yet lightweight ceramic, he cannot resist the chance to construct a spaceship to travel to the Moon. He recruits Nicholl to help build the ship. Meanwhile, Nicholl's daughter Virginia and Barbicane's assistant Ben Sharpe are attracted to each other.

After completing the spaceship, Barbicane, Nicholl, and Sharpe board it and, amid much fanfare, take off. Once they are in outer space, the strongly religious Nicholl reveals that he has sabotaged the vessel, believing that Barbicane has flouted God's laws. When it is discovered that Virginia has stowed away, Nicholl cooperates with Barbicane in a desperate attempt to save her. Sharpe is knocked out, and he and Virginia are placed in the safest compartment of the ship. Barbicane and Nicholl then fire rockets that send the young couple on their way back to Earth, while the two scientists land on the Moon in another section, with no way off. They are able to signal to the young couple that they have reached the Moon safely.

Cast
 Joseph Cotten as Victor Barbicane
 George Sanders as Nicholl
 Debra Paget as Virginia Nicholl
 Don Dubbins as Ben Sharpe
 Patric Knowles as Josef Cartier
 Carl Esmond as Jules Verne
 Henry Daniell as Morgana
 Melville Cooper as Bancroft
 Ludwig Stössel as Aldo Von Metz
 Morris Ankrum as President Ulysses S. Grant (uncredited)
 Robert Clarke as Narrator (voice, uncredited)

Production
Blacklisted screenwriter Dalton Trumbo was brought in to give the script "a quick polish".

Location shooting for From the Earth to the Moon took place in Mexico.

Various electronic sound effects in the film score were reused from  MGM's soundtrack for Forbidden Planet (1956), composed by Louis and Bebe Barron.

References

External links

 
 
 
 
 

1958 films
1950s science fiction films
Films based on From the Earth to the Moon
American science fiction films
Films directed by Byron Haskin
Films set in the 1860s
RKO Pictures films
1950s English-language films
1950s American films